Hubertus Gerardus Josephus Henricus "Huub" Oosterhuis (born 1933) is a Dutch theologian and poet. He is mainly known for his contribution to Christian music and liturgy in the Dutch language, used in both Protestant and Roman Catholic churches, although a few songs have been censored in some dioceses. He is the author of over 60 books and at the time of over 700 hymns, songs, Psalms (often in an own interpretation), and prayers.

Career
Oosterhuis was born on 1 November 1933 in Amsterdam. He was a Jesuit and a Roman Catholic priest until his defrocking in 1969.

In 1954, inspired by Che Guevara who said that churches have the potential to transform the social structure of society, Oosterhuis combined his priesthood with political activism.

In 1965, Oosterhuis became one of the major supporters of ecumenism, following the modernist interpretation of the Second Vatican Council. He started out to rewrite the liturgy and make it acceptable to all. Some of his changes were considered controversial within the Roman Catholic Church especially writing the prayer for agnostics: "Heer, als U bestaat, kom dan onder ons" ("Lord, if You exist, come amongst us").

His political views, conflicts regarding the liturgy and unorthodox views regarding priestly celibacy led to Oosterhuis being dismissed from the Jesuit order and defrocked by the Bishop of Harlem Theodorus Zwartkruis in 1969. He left the Catholic Church and functioned as an Independent Catholic priest, in charge of a church in Amsterdam, for about forty years. He is still focussed on writing liturgy, poetry and essays.

Back in the sixties and seventies his liturgical texts were put to music by his fellow former Jesuit  (1922–2003). This co-operation between Oosterhuis and Huijbers ended; Huijbers engaged himself more and more in a "spirituality-without-God" or "- without-Thou", while Oosterhuis kept to his biblical prayers, hymns, and psalms. After they split up and Huijbers moved to the South of France, Oosterhuis' main composers were two of Huijbers' pupils,  (born 1945) and Tom Löwenthal (born 1954).

Oosterhuis founded the discussion center "" ("The Red Hat") in Amsterdam in 1989. The building was a more or less deserted former Remonstrant shelter church, hidden because Remonstrantism was outlawed in the 17th century. Oosterhuis wanted to use it for his student organization (1990) and create a discussion center. Its nice interior made it also very suitable for TV shows. After a short period Oosterhuis was replaced by a managing director for a more commercial exploitation of this prominent building in Amsterdam's Canal zone.

Prince Claus

In 2002 Queen Beatrix of the Netherlands asked him to deliver the eulogy at the funeral of her Prince-Consort Claus von Amsberg, a longtime personal friend, in the New Church in Delft. That same week the Protestant VU University in Amsterdam granted Oosterhuis an honorary doctorate in theology.

At De Rode Hoed André van der Louw announced his Social Democratic Renewal Program, an incentive to reform the Labour Party. Oosterhuis ultimately chose the less-known Socialist Party, as he viewed it as closer to socialist ideals. He said that "The Socialist Party is closer to the social ethics of the Bible than many Christian parties."

In 2006 elections Oosterhuis stood as final candidate, a symbolic position, for the Socialist Party.

Huub Oosterhuis is the father of the musicians Trijntje Oosterhuis and Tjeerd Oosterhuis.

Translations 
Very few books, poems, and verses of Huub Oosterhuis have been translated into English: e.g. Fifty Psalms, Your Word is Near, At Times I See, The Children of the Poor Man, Wake Your Power (CD).

Some of his songs were translated into German. Lothar Zenetti translated his "Ik sta voor U in leegte en gemis" to "Ich steh vor dir mit leeren Händen, Herr" (I stand before You with empty hands), which was included in German Protestant and Catholic hymnals. "Herr, wir bringen in Brot und Wein" is a translation of an offertory hymn, by Dieter Trautwein with a melody by Peter Janssens which is included in Gotteslob. His song "Heer, onze Heer" written in 1965 to a traditional Dutch melody, was translated to German as "Herr, unser Herr, wie bist du zugegen", and included in several hymnals and songbooks.

References

1933 births
Living people
Christian hymnwriters
Dutch Christian socialists
Dutch hymnwriters
Dutch male poets
20th-century Dutch Roman Catholic theologians
Former Jesuits
Writers from Amsterdam
Catholic socialists
Christian socialist theologians
21st-century Dutch Roman Catholic theologians